David Dabydeen (born 9 December 1955) is a Guyanese-born broadcaster, novelist, poet and academic. He was formerly Guyana's Ambassador to UNESCO (United Nations Education, Science and Culture Organisation) from 1997 to 2010 and the youngest Member of the UNESCO Executive Board (1993–1997), elected by the General Council of all Member States of UNESCO. He was appointed Guyana's Ambassador Plenipotentiary and Extraordinaire to China, from 2010 to 2015. He is one of the longest serving diplomats in the history of Guyana, most of his work done in a voluntary unpaid capacity.

Early life and education

Dabydeen was born in Berbice, Guyana, his birth registered at New Amsterdam Registrar of Births as David Horace Clarence Harilal Sookram. His Indo-Guyanese family trace their heritage back to East Indian indentured workers who had been brought to Guyana between 1838 and 1917. His parents divorced while he was young and he grew up with his mother, Veronica Dabydeen, and his maternal grandparents. At the age of 10 he won a scholarship to Queen's College in Georgetown. When he was 13 years old, he moved to London, England, to rejoin his father, a teacher then attorney David Harilal Sookram, who had migrated to Britain.

At the age of 18 he took up a place at Selwyn College, University of Cambridge, United Kingdom, to read English, and he graduated with a Bachelor of Arts with honours and with the English Prize for Creative Writing (the first time the Sir Arthur Quiller Couch Prize was awarded, in 1978). He then gained a PhD in 18th-century literature and art at University College London in 1982, and was awarded a Resident Fellowship at the Centre for British Art, Yale University, followed by a research fellowship at Wolfson College, Oxford University.

Career

Between 1982 and 1984 Dabydeen worked as a community education officer in Wolverhampton, the political territory of Enoch Powell. He subsequently went to the Centre for Caribbean Studies at the University of Warwick in Coventry, where he progressed over the years from lecturer to director. He was president of the Association for the Teaching of Caribbean, African, and Asian Literature between 1985 and 1987.

In 1993 he elected by the member states of UNESCO to its Executive Board and in 1997 to 2010,  Ambassador at UNESCO.

In 2010 Dabydeen was appointed as Guyana's Ambassador to China, holding the post until the change of government in Guyana at the 11 May 2015 elections. One of his major achievements, in the field of education, was to persuade the Government of China to establish and fund a Confucius Institute at the University of Guyana.

He was Professorial Fellow in the Office of the Vice Chancellor and President of the University of Warwick (2016-2019) having served at Warwick from 1984 to 2010 as Director of the Centre for Caribbean Studies and Professor of Postcolonial Literature, teaching undergraduate and graduate courses on Black British History and Culture; The Literature of Slavery; Caribbean Literature; Immigrant writers in Britain. He was instrumental in raising funds to rename the Centre, the Yesu Persaud Centre for Caribbean Studies, and to ensure its permanence at Warwick. 

In 2020, he established in London the Ameena Gafoor Institute for the Study of Indentureship and its Legacies, and currently serves as its Director. Its Honorary Patrons include Professor Uma Mesthrie (Mahatma Gandhi's great granddaughter), Dr Patricia Rodney, Lord Parekh and Professor David Olusoga.

Writing

Dabydeen is the author of seven novels, three collections of poetry and works of non-fiction and criticism, as editor as well as author. His first book, Slave Song (1984), a collection of poetry, won the Commonwealth Poetry Prize and the Quiller-Couch Prize. A further collection, Turner: New and Selected Poems, was published in 1994, and reissued in 2002; the title-poem, Turner, is an extended sequence or verse novel responding to a painting by J. M. W. Turner, "Slavers Throwing overboard the Dead and Dying – Typhoon coming on" (1840).

Dabydeen's first novel, The Intended (1991), the story of a young Asian student abandoned in London by his father, was shortlisted for the  UK John Llewellyn Rhys Prize won the Guyana Prize for Literature. Disappearance (1993) tells the story of a young Guyanese engineer working on the south coast of England who lodges with an elderly woman. The Counting House (1996) is set at the end of the 19th century and narrates the experiences of an Indian couple whose hopes of a new life in colonial Guyana end in tragedy. The story explores historical tensions between indentured Indian workers and Guyanese of African descent. The novel was shortlisted for the 1998 Dublin Literary Prize. His 1999 novel, A Harlot's Progress, is based on a series of pictures painted in 1732 by William Hogarth (who was the subject of Dabydeen's PhD) and develops the story of the black boy in the series of paintings. The novel was shortlisted for the James Tait Black Memorial Prize, Britain's oldest literary prize.  His novel Our Lady of Demerara was published in 2004 and also won the Guyana Prize for Literature. he then published two other novels, Molly and the Muslim Stick (2009) and Johnson's Dictionary  (2013)

In 2000 Dabydeen was made a Fellow of the Royal Society of Literature. He was the third West Indian writer (V. S. Naipaul was the first) and the only Guyanese writer to be awarded the title.

In 2001 Dabydeen wrote and presented The Forgotten Colony, a BBC Radio 4 programme exploring the history of Guyana. His one-hour documentary Painting the People was broadcast by BBC television in 2004.

The Oxford Companion to Black British History, co-edited by Dabydeen, John Gilmore and Cecily Jones, appeared in 2007.

In 2007, Dabydeen was awarded the Hind Rattan (Jewel of India) Award for his outstanding contribution to literature and the intellectual life of the Indian diaspora.

Bibliography
Slave Song (poetry), Dangaroo, 1984; Peepal Tree Press, 2005
Caribbean Literature: A Teacher's Handbook, Heinemann Educational Books, 1985
The Black Presence in English Literature (editor), Manchester University Press, 1985
A Reader's Guide to West Indian and Black British Literature (with Nana Wilson-Tagoe), Hansib/University of Warwick Centre for Caribbean Studies, 1987
Hogarth's Blacks: Images of Blacks in 18th-Century English Art (art history), Manchester University Press, 1987
Hogarth, Walpole and Commercial Britain (art history), Hansib, 1987 
India in the Caribbean (editor with Brinsley Samaroo), Hansib, 1987
Coolie Odyssey (poetry), Hansib, 1988
Handbook for Teaching Caribbean Literature, Heinemann, 1988
Rented Rooms (editor), Dangaroo Press, 1988
Black Writers in Britain 1760–1890 (editor with Paul Edwards), Edinburgh University Press, 1991
The Intended (novel), Secker & Warburg, 1991; Peepal Tree Press, 2005
Disappearance (novel), Secker & Warburg, 1993; Peepal Tree Press, 2005
Turner: New and Selected Poems (poetry), Jonathan Cape, 1994; Peepal Tree Press, 2002
Across the Dark Waters: Ethnicity and Indian Identity in the Caribbean, Macmillan, 1996
The Counting House (novel), 1996; Peepal Tree Press, 2005
A Harlot's Progress (novel), Jonathan Cape, 1999
No Island is an Island: Selected Speeches of Sir Shridath Ramphal (editor with John Gilmore, Warwick University Caribbean Studies), Macmillan, 2000
Turner: New and Selected Poems (poetry), Jonathan Cape, 1994; Peepal Tree Press, 2002
Our Lady of Demerara (novel), Dido Press, 2004
The Oxford Companion to Black British History (co-editor, with John Gilmore and Cecily Jones), Oxford University Press, 2007
Selected Poems of Egbert Martin (editor), Heaventree Press, 2007
Broadcast 2: Picture Thinking and Other Stories (co-editor with Jane Commane), Heaventree Press, 2007
Molly and the Muslim Stick (novel), Macmillan Caribbean Writers, 2008
The First Crossing: Being the Diary of Theophilus Richmond, Ship's Surgeon Aboard The Hesperus, 1837–8 (co-editor), Heaventree Press, 2008
Pak's Britannica. Articles by and Interviews with David Dabydeen (ed. Lynne Macedo), University of West Indies Press, 2011.
Johnson's Dictionary (novel), Peepal Tree Press, 2013
We Mark Your Memory. Writings from the descendants of Indenture (co-editor, with Maria del Pilar Kaladeen and Tina K. Ramnarine), School of Advanced Study Press, University of London, 2017

Prizes and awards
1984: Commonwealth Poetry Prize – Slave Song
1978: Quiller-Couch Prize (Cambridge) – Slave Song
1991: Guyana Prize for Literature – The Intended
1998: Shortlisted for the International Dublin Literary Award for the best book of fiction published in the previous two years worldwide.
1999: James Tait Black Memorial Prize (for fiction), shortlist – A Harlot's Progress
2004: Raja Rao Award for Literature (India)
2007: Hind Rattan (Jewel of India) Award
2008: Anthony Sabga Award for Caribbean Excellence. The largest recognition prize in the region and commonly called the "Caribbean Nobel"
Four other Guyana Literature Prizes for his novels A Harlot's Progress; Our Lady of Demerara;  Molly and the Muslim Stick and Johnson's Dictionary.

Further reading
Kevin Grant (ed.): The Art of David Dabydeen, Peepal Tree Press, 1997.
Tobias Döring: "Turning the Colonial Gaze: Re-Visions of Terror in Dabydeen's Turner", in Third Text 38, 3–14.
Emily Allen Williams: Poetic Negotiation of Identity in the works of Brathwaite, Harris, Senior and Dabydeen, Edwin Mellen Press, 2000.
Kampta Karran and Lynne Macedo (eds.): No Land, No Mother: Essays on David Dabydeen, Peepal Tree Press, 2007.
Lynne Macedo (ed.): Talking Words. New Essays on the Work of David Dabydeen. University of West Indies Press, 2011.
Abigail Ward: Caryl Phillips, David Dabydeen and Fred D'Aguiar: Representations of Slavery, Manchester University Press, 2011.

References

External links 
 David Dabydeen details at Peepal Tree Press
 

1955 births
Living people
Alumni of Selwyn College, Cambridge
Alumni of University College London
Fellows of Wolfson College, Oxford
Guyanese writers
Guyanese novelists
Guyanese poets
Fellows of the Royal Society of Literature
Honorary Fellows of Selwyn College, Cambridge
Academics of the University of Warwick
Guyanese emigrants to England
English people of Indo-Guyanese descent
Ambassadors of Guyana to China
Permanent Delegates of Guyana to UNESCO
Guyanese diplomats
Black British academics
People from New Amsterdam, Guyana
Guyanese academics
Indo-Guyanese people
20th-century male writers
21st-century male writers
21st-century novelists
20th-century poets
21st-century poets
20th-century Guyanese writers